The Mariners' Lake is a reservoir which was created as part of the natural park on the grounds of the Mariners' Museum and Park located in the independent city of Newport News in the Hampton Roads region of southeastern Virginia.

The museum was founded in 1932 by Archer Milton Huntington, son of Collis P. Huntington, a railroad builder who brought the Chesapeake and Ohio Railway to Warwick County, Virginia, and who founded the City of Newport News, its coal export facilities,  and Newport News Shipbuilding in the late 19th century.

Archer and his wife, the sculptor Anna Hyatt Huntington, acquired 800 acres (3.2 km²) of land that would come to hold 61,000 square feet (5,700 m²) of exhibition galleries, a research library, a 167-acre (676,000 m²) lake, a five-mile (8 km) shoreline trail with fourteen bridges, and over 35,000 maritime artifacts from around the globe. After acquisition took place, the first two years were devoted to creating and improving a natural park and constructing a dam to create a lake that the Board of Trustees named "Lake Maury", after the nineteenth-century Virginian Commodore Matthew Fontaine Maury, who was nicknamed the "Father of Modern Oceanography".

The Museum's collection is of an international scope and includes 35,000 artifacts. There are 10 permanent galleries, changing and traveling exhibits, and virtual galleries available through the museum website. The Mariners' Museum is home to the U.S.S. Monitor Center, which officially opened on March 9, 2007, and includes display of a full-scale replica of the ironclad warship Monitor, the original recovered turret, and many artifacts and related items. The famous Union ironclad USS Monitor fought the Confederate  ironclad CSS Virginia in the Battle of Hampton Roads in March 1862 during the American Civil War.

On , during the George Floyd protests, as references to Confederate figures were being removed from names, The Mariners' Museum's Board of Trustees voted to rename the lake from "Lake Maury" to "The Mariners' Lake".

References

External links 
15 Slideshow images of Lake Maury
The Mariners' Museum

Maury
Bodies of water of Newport News, Virginia
Parks in Newport News, Virginia
Matthew Fontaine Maury
Name changes due to the George Floyd protests